Codia is a genus of trees and shrubs in the family Cunoniaceae.  The genus is  endemic to New Caledonia in the Pacific and contains 15 species. The leaves are opposite or whorled, simple, and the margin usually entire. The flowers are arranged in capitula. the ovary is inferior. The fruit is indehiscent and is covered with woolly hairs.

An extinct species of Codia, C. australiensis, has been found as a fossil in Australia, resembling the juvenile foliage of a living species in the genus. Codia is most closely related to the Australian Callicoma serratifolia.

List of species 

(all endemic to New Caledonia)

Codia albicans 
Codia albifrons 
Codia belepensis 
Codia discolor 
Codia ferruginea 
Codia fusca 
Codia incrassata 
Codia jaffrei 
Codia mackeeana 
Codia microphylla 
Codia montana 
Codia nitida 
Codia spatulata 
Codia triverticillata 
Codia xerophila

References

External links

Cunoniaceae
Endemic flora of New Caledonia
Oxalidales genera